Dieidapersa is a monotypic moth genus in the family Cossidae. Its only species is Dieidapersa persa, which is found in Iran.

References

Natural History Museum Lepidoptera generic names catalog

Cossinae
Monotypic moth genera
Moths of Asia
Moths described in 1911